The Critics was an Australian television series which aired on ABC. Two versions were produced, one for Sydney and another for Melbourne. Debuting 1959, the Melbourne version ran to 1960, while the Sydney version ran to circa 1962.

Format
A panel of three members would review or discuss three works, often a book, a film and an event. For example, in the 10 March 1960 Melbourne edition, the book was The Heroes by Ronald McKie, the film was The Wreck of the Mary Deare and the event was The Tommy Steele Show. In a 1959 Sydney edition (shown in Melbourne on 1 November 1959), the panel discussed Yugoslav State Company dancers and musicians, the novel Henderson the Rain King by Saul Bellow, and the Sydney appearance by U.S. rock singer Fabian.

Episode status
It is not known how many episodes are still extant, given the erratic survival rate of 1950s/early 1960s Australian television series. Telerecordings of two or three episodes are held by National Archives of Australia.

References

See also
Any Questions

External links

1959 Australian television series debuts
1962 Australian television series endings
Australian live television series
Australian Broadcasting Corporation original programming
Black-and-white Australian television shows
English-language television shows
Australian non-fiction television series